iGap is a free Iranian instant messaging application for smart phones and personal computers. iGap allows users to interact with each other and exchange information through text, image, video, audio and other types of messages. iGap also supports P2P-based voice calls over the internet.

iGap is developed for Android, iOS and Windows.

Open-source Clients 
iGap has published the source code of its Android and iOS client on GitHub. However, back-end source code is proprietary software.

Response 
Supreme leader of Iran Ali Khamenei referred to this messenger on his personal website. and
Mohammad-Javad Azari Jahromi as the ICT Minister of Iran has joined this messaging application in September 2017 in order to support local social networking.
Earlier, the Minister has claimed to support local Messengers when he was deputy of the ICT Minister.

External links 
 iGap in App Store
 iGap in Google Play

References 

2015 software
Communication software
Cross-platform software
Instant messaging clients
IOS software
Secure communication
Free security software
Free instant messaging clients
Free and open-source Android software
2015 establishments in Iran
Communications in Iran